Leonard Kiplimo Barsoton  (born 21 October 1994) is a Kenyan long-distance runner who competes mainly in cross country running and track events. He has represented his country twice at the IAAF World Cross Country Championships and was a silver medallist over 10,000 metres at the African Games.

Career
After starting his career based in Japan, Barsoton emerged as a junior athlete in 2013 by placing second to Ronald Kwemoi at the national cross country trials. He was chosen for the junior team at the 2013 IAAF World Cross Country Championships and claimed the silver medal in both the individual and team races, having finished adrift of the comfortable favourite Hagos Gebrhiwet. After a runner-up finish behind Bedan Karoki at the Kenyan Cross Country Championships, he led Kenya to a sweep of the medals at the 2014 African Cross Country Championships, winning the race with his teammates Kipruto Kangogo, Rono Cherop and Solomon Kirwa Yego completing the top four. He also proved himself on the track that year with a 10,000 metres best of 27:20.74 minutes, ending the year fifth on the world rankings.

Barsoton established himself as a senior level runner in the 2015 season. Following his third place at the Kenyan Championships, he finished fifth at the 2015 IAAF World Cross Country Championships, helping the Kenyan men to a team silver. On the outdoor track he took a 10,000 m silver at the 2015 African Games, beaten by Ethiopia's Tsebelu Zewude. He failed to build on this in the 2016, not making any national teams, and ranked just outside the world's top 30 for the 10,000 m for season.

He became national champion at the 2017 Kenyan Cross Country Championships.

Personal bests
3000 metres – 8:07.1 min (2011)
5000 metres – 13:16.25 min (2015)
10,000 metres – 27:20.74 min (2014)
10K run – 27:42 min (2016)

All information from All-Athletics profile

International competitions

National titles
Kenyan Cross Country Championships
Senior race: 2017

References

External links

Interview at 2013 IAAF World Cross Country Championships

Living people
1994 births
Kenyan male long-distance runners
Kenyan male cross country runners
African Games silver medalists for Kenya
African Games medalists in athletics (track and field)
Athletes (track and field) at the 2015 African Games
African Cross Country Championships winners
Kenyan expatriate sportspeople in Japan
20th-century Kenyan people
21st-century Kenyan people